Gabriele Ricciardelli (born c. 1690, flourished c. 1743– c. 1777 or 1782), was an Italian painter of the Baroque period, active mainly in depicting landscapes.

Biography
He was born in Naples to an engraver and landscape painter, Giuseppe Ricciardelli. He trained under Nicola Bonito in Naples, but then moved to Rome to train under Jan Frans van Bloemen, (also known as Orizzonte), where he encountered the work of Gaspard Poussin and Claude Lorraine. Grossi cites his death circa 1760.
 
He was active and popular in Naples in the court of Charles of Bourbon, employed at Portici and he provided them with several over-doors ('sopraporte') pictures for Naples' Palazzo Reale. He specialized in seascapes, and landscapes (vedute).  One institution  described his work thus: His Irish scenes being distinguished by his excellently accurate portrayal of architectural features.

An auction cataloguer described him thus: Ricciardelli was exceptional among the Neapolitan view painters in that he spent part of his career in Ireland (Dublin 1753-1759) and England (1777). His four vedute of Naples, engraved by Antonio Cardon in 1765, found great success with the English nobility.

When in Dublin, c. 1753, his patrons included Ralph Howard, 2nd Viscount Wicklow, four of his views of Naples were in the Shelton Abbey sale of 1950; Thomas Dawson, Lord Dartrey; and Dublin's Rotunda Hospital, for which an unfinished commission. The dating of the Drogheda pair is based on the inclusion of St. Peter's Church of Ireland, which was rebuilt to a Palladian design from 1748 and re-consecrated, on 22 September 1752.

Gallery

References

Italian Baroque painters
18th-century Italian painters
Italian male painters
Painters from Naples
Landscape artists
Year of death unknown
1690 births
Year of birth uncertain
18th-century Italian male artists